The men's doubles event at the 2018 Mediterranean Games was held from 26 to 29 June at the Tarragona Tennis Club.

Corentin Denolly and Alexandre Müller of France, won the gold medal, defeating Aziz Dougaz and Anis Ghorbel of Tunisia, in the final, 4–6, 7–6, [12–10].

Sarp Ağabigün and Anıl Yüksel of Turkey, won the bronze medal, defeating Gonçalo Falcão and Bernardo Saraiva of Portugal in the bronze medal match, 6–2, 3–6, [11–9].

Medalists

Seeds

Draw

Draw

References

External links
 Draw

Tennis at the 2018 Mediterranean Games